Cancellaria richardpetiti is a species of sea snail, a marine gastropod mollusk in the family Cancellariidae, the nutmeg snails.

Description
Original description: "Shell thin, fragile, composed of 6 whorls; spire protracted, body whorl elongated; body whorl and spire whorls ornamented with longitudinal ribs; 32 ribs on body whorl, running from suture to anterior tip; ribs on spire whorls more prominent, producing varix-like appearance; longitudinal ribs intersected by raised, spiral cords; large bead produced where rib and cord intersect, forming general appearance of longitudinal lines of beads; protoconch very large; aperture narrow; columella with 3 folds, posteriormost being the largest; color white, with 3 wide, uninterrupted bands of  orange-brown around body whorl, one along shoulder, one anterior of mid-body, and one around siphonal canal; spire whorls solid orange-brown with thin white band along suture; interior of aperture white; 3-whorled protoconch dark brown; interior of aperture white."

Distribution
Locus typicus: "(Dredged from) 150 metres depth
50 kilometres South of Apalachicola, Florida, USA."

References

External links

Cancellariidae
Gastropods described in 1987